"Golden" is the first single released by American soul and R&B singer-songwriter Jill Scott, from her third album Beautifully Human: Words and Sounds Vol. 2. The song peaked at 59 on the UK Singles Chart. It was also featured in 2008's Grand Theft Auto IV game and soundtrack, and also is played in the films Beauty Shop (2005), Obsessed (2009) and What Men Want (2019).

Track listing
US 12" Promo

UK Maxi-Single

Charts

References

2004 singles
Jill Scott (singer) songs
Funk songs